Tav or TAV may refer to:

Math, science and technology
 Tav (number), in set theory the collection of all cardinal numbers
 The Advanced Visualizer, a 3D graphics software package
 Tomato aspermy virus, a plant virus
 Tropical Atlantic Variability, in meteorology
 Ti-6Al-4V, a titanium alloy containing aluminum and vanadium
 Treno Alta Velocità, a special-purpose entity for the construction of a high-speed rail network in Italy

Codes
 TAV, IATA airport code for Tau Airport, American Samoa
 TAV, airline code for Compañía de Servicios Aéreos Tavisa
 tav, ISO 639-3 code for the Tatuyo language of Colombia

Nickname
 Tav Falco (born 1945), American  musical performer, performance artist, actor, filmmaker and photographer
 Octavio M. Salati (1914–2001), American engineer, academic and educator

Other uses
 Tav (letter), the last letter of many Semitic abjads
 TAV Airports Holding (Tepe Akfen Ventures), a Turkish airport operator
 Treno Alta Velocità, the working name for the planning and construction of the Italian high-speed rail network
 The Artists Village, an experimental arts group in Singapore
 Toon-A-Vision channel

See also
 TAV-8B, the two-seat version of the McDonnell Douglas AV-8B Harrier II aircraft
 TAV RJ-SP, the Brazilian Rio–São Paulo high-speed rail system